Seticyphella is a genus of fungi in the Cyphellaceae family. The genus contains three species found in Europe.

References

Cyphellaceae
Agaricales genera